Vladimir Kononov (born March 3, 1958, Novosibirsk) is a Russian political figure and a deputy of the 6th, 7th, and 8th State Dumas. 

In 1989, Kononov was granted a Candidate of Sciences degree in Philosophy. In 2016, he defended Doctor of Sciences degree in Political Sciences. 

Starting from 1979, he was a member of the Komsomol organization. In 1985, while being the secretary of the Novosibirsk City Komsomol Committee, he created and headed the Youth Initiatives Fund (FMI), which became the first self-financing organization in the Soviet Union. In 1989, he founded and directed the Association for Foreign Economic Cooperation, which united more than a hundred self-financing associations in more than 50 regions of the USSR. Two years later, together with his friend Aleksandr Korolev, Kononov founded and headed the construction and investment company "KONKOR". Since 2011, he has been the deputy of the State Duma of the 6th, 7th, and 8th convocations.

In 2013, Kononov was ranked 11th in the Forbes list of wealthiest federal officials.

References

1958 births
Living people
United Russia politicians
21st-century Russian politicians
Sixth convocation members of the State Duma (Russian Federation)
Seventh convocation members of the State Duma (Russian Federation)
Eighth convocation members of the State Duma (Russian Federation)
Politicians from Novosibirsk